Osteochilus scapularis is a species of cyprinid fish found in the Malay Peninsula, Borneo, and Sumatra.

References

Taxa named by Henry Weed Fowler
Fish described in 1939
Osteochilus